Cannibal Apocalypse (also known as Invasion of the Flesh Hunters) is a 1980 action horror film directed by Antonio Margheriti (under the pseudonym 'Anthony M. Dawson') and starring John Saxon, Elizabeth Turner, Giovanni Lombardo Radice, Cinzia De Carolis, Tony King and Ramiro Oliveros. The film combines the cannibal film genre with a forerunner of Margheriti's Vietnam War films.

Plot
The film opens with a flashback to the Vietnam War, where Norman Hopper is bitten by a U.S. POW Charlie Bukowski who is infected with a virus which leaves people with a craving for human flesh. In Atlanta, Georgia, some years later, Hopper wakes up from a nightmare about this incident, and then receives a phone call from Bukowski, who invites his old comrade out for a drink. The call comes in at an inopportune moment, as a young neighbour girl, Mary, was trying to seduce him, so he turns down the invitation. Hopper falls for her charms and as they are about to engage in oral sex, he bites her. After hearing from his concerned wife that a Vietnam vet barricaded himself in a mall, he gets into his car. Just as he is about to leave, Mary reveals that she enjoyed the bite. After arriving on the scene, he convinces Bukowski to surrender to the police. While being hauled away to the hospital, Bukowski bites a police constable.

After returning home, Hopper instructs his wife Jane to wait for him in the house, and walks in front of Mary's window. Later, he admits to the incident and his wish to bite a fellow-human, to his wife. At the hospital, Bukowski and fellow vet Tom get into a fight with the guards, and Bukowski bites the leg of nurse Helen. Dr Mendez calls Jane and tells her that Norman might be experiencing the same symptoms and that she should bring him over to the hospital for a checkup, while he is listening in on the conversation, after which he leaves the house.

The police get the coroner's report on the mall shootout and it contains warnings of cannibalism. At the same time, Jane meets Dr. Mendez, who has been trying to seduce her before. They are at a fancy piano bar, where he explains to her that the virus causes a biological mutation, due to psychic alteration. Norman voluntarily goes to the hospital and talks to a doctor about his symptoms and his well-founded suspicions on Dr. Mendez' intentions with his wife. The doctor also takes a blood sample.

At the police station, the bitten constable shoots a fellow cop, bites another cop and ends up shot by Captain McCoy. Norman comes across his sedated fellow vets Charlie and Tommy. He experiences a flashback to the initial incident where he got bit by an infected POW. The doctor gets attacked by Helen while inspecting Hopper's blood sample. First she bites off his tongue and then she bashes his head in with a rock. In an ambulance the bitten cop gets aggressive before she dies. In the hospital, Helen frees Tommy and Charlie. Norman kills a staff member who tries to notify the authorities.

Norman, Helen, Tom and Charlie leave the hospital in an ambulance. Jane returns to an empty house and searches for Norman when the phone rings and Dr. Mendez notifies her that Norman disappeared. The police are on high alert and looking for the escapees. The escapees break into a tire shop and find a gun. Charlie uses an angle grinder to slice up a victim. Tom steals a station wagon and the infected leave with a pistol and a bag of snacks.

They get confronted by a biker gang that Charlie already fought at the mall, killing one of their members. After defeating the gang, they run away on foot and escape into the sewer just as the police arrive on the scene. The police coordinate a blockade of the sewer exits in order to trap the suspects. At the Hopper residence, Jane is unable to make a telephone call and goes next door to ask Mary's aunt to use the phone. Mary and her brother greet her and let her use the phone to call Dr. Mendez, but the aunt is nowhere to be seen. The children behave suspiciously and ask her how come her phone is not working, but they let her leave.

In the sewer, Helen gets attacked by a rat just as the cannibals are about to slip away from the police. She ends up being shot along with a cop. Charlie is killed by the police, while Norman is wounded. Tom goes berserk, attacks the police and is killed with a flamethrower. Even with a wounded leg, Norman crawls out of the sewer, steals a car and leaves the scene.

Jane tries to leave the house in her car but cannot start it. As she comes back into the house, she hears strange noises and calls for Norman. She finds him in his dress uniform, telling her to stay away. Norman is hurt and dying, and Dr. Mendez walks into the house. Jane runs over to him, but he bites her as Norman shoots him. Jane points his gun at her own head and two shots are heard just as the police arrive on the scene.

The infected children watch as the bodies are being hauled away. The boy asks Mary if they will be looking for their aunt. Her hand is seen inside the fridge.

Cast

Production 
Filming took place on-location in Atlanta and Decatur, Georgia. Locations included the Savannah College of Art and Design, CNN Center, and the Candler Discount Mall. Interiors were filmed at De Paolis Studios in Rome. Giannetto De Rossi was the special makeup effects designer. The opening Vietnam War sequence re-used props and costumes from Antonio Margheriti's previous film, The Last Hunter.

Actor John Saxon had gotten a badly translated script, in which the gory parts were left out. In a 2002 interview Saxon explained: "It was talking about the Vietnam war like it was a virus you could bring home. I thought it was a great metaphor for a psychological condition." Saxon only learned what the movie was truly about during shooting. "At one point we were shooting a scene and a guy brings in this tray of meat. I asked what it was for and they explained to me it was supposed to be body parts, even genitals, and we were supposed to gnaw on them. I asked Margheriti to take me out of the scene and I went to my hotel room. Once I found out what the true nature of the film was I got so depressed." Saxon contemplated leaving the production altogether.

Release
Cannibal Apocalypse was released theatrically in 1980.

The film was released on DVD by Image Entertainment as part of the Euroshock Collection on March 19, 2002. On Blu-ray, Kino Lorber Studio Classics released a high-definition, brand new 4K master version on March 17, 2020.

Critical reception
Patricia MacCormack of Senses of Cinema critiqued, "Although the film has been maligned by critics, who claim Margheriti disinherited his adeptness at the gothic by meddling in the vulgar genre of high-gore, the sympathies he evokes for perversion as at turns tragic pathology and strange alternative desire, the disdain with which he represents hyperreal examples of ‘normal’ male sexuality and the extraordinary versions of human flesh he presents for our pleasure, a pleasure which compels us into a world of perversion and desire beyond the palatable, are all continued thematically if not stylistically in this film. Margheriti's use of Radice and gore brings him from the gothic worlds of Bava and Freda into a subgenre more often associated with Fulci, Umberto Lenzi and Deodato, yet he remains faithful to his perverse paradigms."

Danny Shipka, author of Perverse Titillation, a book on exploitation films from Italy, Spain and France, noted that the films premise was both "interesting" and "silly" and that the film "contains enough blood and gore to make Eurocult fans happy, including some graphic flesh munching, a French-kissing scene that will scare the hell out of you, and a shotgun blast that has to be seen to be believed." Online film database AllMovie stated that the film will "never be confused for high art but Cannibal Apocalypse offers plenty of bizarre low-budget thrills for the Eurotrash aficionados," and that the highlight of the film was John Saxon, noting that "no matter how bizarre or sleazy the premise becomes, Saxon plays the material straight and delivers a serious, well-crafted performance that makes it possible to stick with the film's strange premise."

See also
Deathdream

References

Sources

External links

Cannibal Apocalypse trailer is available for free download at the Internet Archive

1980 films
1980 horror films
Italian horror films
Films directed by Antonio Margheriti
Films set in Atlanta
Films shot in Georgia (U.S. state)
Films about viral outbreaks
Post-traumatic stress disorder in fiction
Films shot in Atlanta
Spanish horror films
Italian action horror films
Vietnam War films
1980s Italian films